is a fighting game developed by Japanese studio GOSHOW and published in Japan by Acquire on January 14, 2010, and in North America by Aksys Games on September 15. It is the prequel to the 2005 video game Colosseum: Road to Freedom, which was originally released for the PlayStation 2.

Plot
Marcus Aurelius Antoninus was the last of the "Five Good Emperors". He was gifted with a brilliant mind, and his influence brought peace, both at home and abroad. However, as Marcus entered his final years, the question of succession was raised, and tempers flared. A secret feud has flared up between the aristocrats and soldiers who supported Commodus, Marcus' son and chosen heir, and those who supported General Cassius. The feud grows more desperate, and less secret, with each passing day. As Rome's days of peace begin to draw to a close, a new gladiator arrives at the Colosseum.

Main characters
The Player: The player is described by others as calm in the face of challenge and death. Starting out as a simple slave and gladiator, the player gradually becomes a powerful warrior and earns the attention of several powerful Roman patrons. Eventually, they gain the notice of the future emperor Commodus himself. Through these connections, the player would play a small yet impactful role on the history of the Roman empire.

Magerius: The lanista of the Ludus Magerius and the owner of the player at the beginning of the game. At this time, he had to begin anew after a match led to the deaths of most of his gladiators. His only real concern is the money earned by his gladiators and he tends to ignore their personal affairs. Magerius has many connections to other ludi and gladiatorial event planners, which he uses in the hopes of obtaining a patron for the player. He was also the player's owner in the Colosseum: Road to Freedom.

Commodus: The upcoming Emperor of Rome. Thinking himself the reincarnation of Hercules, he is preparing to become the ruler of the Roman Empire. In truth, he is hedonistic and arrogant, alienating many allies who are genuinely out for his best interests. Despite his flaws, he holds great confidence in the player who would help him in his rise to power. Commodus would eventually send the player to assassinate his greatest rival, General Cassius. Should the player decide to remain in Commodus' service afterwards, the young emperor would appoint them as a captain of the Praetorian Guard. Commodus' hedonistic pursuits gradually destroyed the peace his father had worked so hard for, earning him the wrath of the Senate. Commodus becomes increasingly paranoid after surviving numerous assassination attempts. In the end, he finds himself trusting only his sister Lucilla and the player.

Patrons
Over the course of the game, the player would have to choose one of four patrons who would sponsor their appearance in gladiatorial events. A different game ending would be shown for each patron should the player choose not to continue under Commodus' service.

Brosius: A famous ex-gladiator and ex-slave, now a lanista, who earned his freedom and started his own ludus with his winnings. He is also the host of his own series of gladiatorial events, the "Providence of Strenia". A man who believes in working towards a better future, Brosius finds ways to better his station in life despite being snubbed by the patricians. He was once the mentor of Castor, who left him for the patronage of the patrician Dominicus. Later, Brosius managed to purchase Medeia's services as a gladiator and thus saved her life from judgement under Roman law. After he refuses to sell Medeia to Dominicus, the patrician begins a scheme to ruin Brosius by bribing away his allies and thus crippling his ability to host or attend events. In a desperate gamble, Brosius requests Magerius to loan the player's services to him while using his lands in Capua as collateral. With the player's victories, Brosius gradually regains his standing among the ludi until he challenged to a bet by Dominicus. After Brosius wins the bet, he gains Dominicus' land as a result. When Commodus' reign begins, Brosius enters politics and he eventually becomes the governor of Aegyptus with the player as his able assistant. Despite the lack of support from patricians and the Senate, Brosius' term as governor bring him much fame and success through a combination of the player's aid and his own decisiveness.

Elisaveta: The beautiful and charming wife of Vipsanius, the treasurer of the Roman Senate. She also hosts the "Whisper of Egeria" gladiatorial events in her husband's absence. Although she appears to the very image of a perfect Roman noblewoman, Elisaveta is restless and craves excitement at heart. Because her husband is often away, Elisaveta often spends her nights with many gladiators and has broken many hearts. As a result, she has many ex-lovers as enemies. Elisaveta soon appoints the player as an assassin with the task of eliminating as many of these ex-lovers as possible. When Vipsanius returns to Rome at this time, her future seems uncertain. With her husband wise to her indiscretions and with ex-lovers plotting against her, she continues to seek solace with the player. After Vipsanius is killed by the player and Commodus' reign begins, Elisaveta becomes a sea-faring merchant in the Mediterranean Sea, with the player serving as her bodyguard and lover. Elisaveta's skill at outsmarting her competitors would become legendary while the player fights off any and all pirates. If the player is female, then Elisaveta purchases a summer home on the island of Lesbos where they could enjoy complete privacy.

Pomponius: A well-received Roman senator who adores gladiatorial combat as a valuable part of Roman culture rather than as a diversion for the people. He is also the host of the "Glory of Campania" gladiatorial events. When gladiator revolts began to occur, he became a target of several assassination attempts that were aimed at taking the lives of the patricians who supported Commodus. At the onset of Commodus' reign, Pomponius eventually retires from politics and becomes a writer. He compiles his notes on gladiatorial combat into a text known as the "Compendium Gladiator" that critics would later dismiss as a reliable source of information. However, this text was the only known historical record of the player, a mysterious but brave gladiator who died at the height of their popularity and whom Pomponius referred to only as a "personal friend". 
 
Aquila: The young but strong-willed daughter of General Aquilius Drusus, who is currently away on a campaign in Syria. She also hosts the "Smile of Bellona", a series of gladiatorial events sponsored by the Drusus family. General Drusus has served faithfully under the banner of Marcus Aurelius during the Germanic Wars, giving his family much influence among Rome's patricians. When rumors about General Drusus' betrayal and death during a campaign in Syria spread to Rome, the reputation of the Drusus family is threatened. Magerius and the player help Aquila investigate the true events concerning General Drusus and fend off attempts by Clodius, a centurion who once served under General Drusus, to claim the Drusus fortune for his own. When General Drusus returns to Rome, alive and well, Aquila introduces the player to him. The player would go on to serve the Drusus family with distinction.

Rival gladiators
Danaos: A mysterious gladiator, known as the "Demon". No one knows the story behind this dark and sinister fighter other than the fact that he is the greatest gladiator of his time. Danaos fights with two deadly battle axes and wears only tattered black clothing and a helmet fashioned to resemble a horned skull that can survive even the most devastating of attacks. Pomponius once considered having the player fight Danaos during a promotional match at a "Glory of Campania" event but quickly decided against it, believing that Danaos would kill the player far too quickly.

Celadus: A gladiator known as "The Red Right Arm" for the red armor that encases his entire right arm and the powerful crimson warhammer carried by that arm. His face is scarred across his right eye, leaving him with only his left eye for sight. Among all the gladiators of Rome, Celadus is second only to Danaos in power and prestige. He would eventually lose his left leg in a battle, forcing him to retire and become the chief trainer at the Ludus Magerius later in life, as seen in the story of Colosseum: Road to Freedom.

Sextus: A formidable, legendary gladiator, nicknamed the "Honor of Rome", who fights with a sharp gladius and a tall shield. Sextus is a warrior from Germania who once fought against General Aquilius Drusus, Aquilla's father, during the Germanic Wars. He lost and was then taken back as a slave to Rome, where he later became the most successful gladiator under the Drusus family's patronage. Despite his hatred for Rome, Sextus respects General Drusus and holds no grudge against him. The general did not kill prisoners and actually treated Sextus and his surviving comrades well. However, Sextus has vowed to never help the Drusus family directly since the general was still responsible for the deaths of his people.

Spartoi: A barbaric, muscular gladiator who eschews weapons in favor of his fists. Because of his savage and relentless fighting style, Spartoi is known to spectators as the "Brute Instinct". He is dressed in armor made from animal bones and is missing his lips, leaving a permanent macabre grin on his face.

Medeia: A beautiful, female gladiator, nicknamed the "Brilliant Goddess", whose skill with two curved blades is both graceful and deadly. Medeia is said to be a descendant of the legendary Amazons. Blunt and quick-tempered, Medeia believes in fighting with honor. Along with her brothers and sisters, she was once a slave to a particularly cruel Roman patrician. As her family died one by one due to abuse by the patrician, Medeia killed her master in a blind rage one day and was to be condemned to death for murder. Fortunately, she came under the patronage and protection of Brosius and has, since then, been his most successful gladiator. The corrupt patrician Dominicus, who reminds Medeia of her old master, tried to purchase her from Brosius. After Brosius refuses to do so, Domenicus bribes the lanista's allies to shun him in an effort to pressure him into selling Medeia. Brosius gradually regains his standing with the player's help until he is challenged to a bet by Dominicus. Unsurprisingly, the patrician specifically asked for Medeia as a prize for Brosius' side of the bet. She is put on the sidelines as a result, much to her disappointment. After Brosius wins the bet, Medeia resumes her gladiatorial career.

Spiculus: A shrewd African gladiator known as the "Speed of Silver Flame" for his polished, silvery armor and the lightning-like quickness of his sword. His handsome appearance is the desire of every woman and the envy of every man. Elisaveta once said that even Milichus, a very capable gladiator in his own right, would be a weakling compared to Spiculus. He is under the patronage of Vipsanius.

Nemesis:  A confident female gladiator from Thrace, nicknamed the "Bloody Queen Bee", who is known for her deep crimson armor and her unequaled skill with a spear. She is under the patronage of the Drusus family. The player fights her in the arena in exchange for information concerning the true fate of General Drusus.

Ursus: A mysterious gladiator from Aegyptus known as the "Messenger of the Sun", whose armor is based on the appearance of the Egyptian god Horus. While fighting with twin blades, Ursus uses strange, unorthodox movements and battle cries that often baffle his opponents. In battle, he favors aerial attacks and is often compared to a diving bird. Along with Hories, Ursus is one of Vipsanius' favorite gladiators.

Hories: A mysterious gladiator from Aegyptus nicknamed the "Arbiter of Souls", whose armor is based on the appearance of the Egyptian god Anubis. His fighting style is as strange as that of Ursus, except that Hories prefers attacks that target the legs and lower body. He seems to crawl along the floor quickly when fighting. Along with Ursus, Hories is one of Vipsanius' favorite gladiators. When Hories and Ursus are partnered together during a match, the two warriors become almost unstoppable.

Aibell: A young female gladiator from Britannia from the Ludus Generidus who skillfully uses a battle axe and a heavy shield in battle. Pomponius once compared her axe to a thunderclap and her shield to a stone wall. Due to her youthful appearance, Aibell is known to spectators as the "Adorable Savage". She is fiercely independent and extremely proud of her Celtic heritage, sometimes quoting the deities of her homeland when talking. Aibell is not actually the young gladiator's name, but the name of a mythological being given to her by her Roman admirers. She is under the patronage of Pomponius and serves as one of his bodyguards when he is threatened with assassination. When Generidus starts gladiator riots to kill senators loyal to Commodus, Aibell becomes his willing accomplice. This was because, like many gladiators, she hated Romans for sending countless slaves to die in the arena for their amusement. When Pomponius demonstrates compassion to gladiators and voices his thoughts on how others would think of Romans, Aibell began to have second thoughts about Generidus' plot. After she is defeated in a match, Aibell warns the player of an attempt on Apicius' life. After the player kills the would-be assassins, Aibell says that she now realizes that not all Romans were cruel and reveals Generidus as the mastermind behind the riots. After Generidus' death at the hands of the player, Aibell's fate remains unknown but it is assumed that she retains Pomponius' favor.

Flamma: An overweight gladiator nicknamed the "Moving Volcano" for his reckless fighting style and his strength, said to be that of many men. He wields a mace and a large shield when in the arena. Despite being a gladiator, Flamma is a patrician by birth and is loyal to the Roman aristocracy. He is the most powerful gladiator under the patronage of the senator Apicius, who assigns Flamma to fight the player at a "Glory of Campania" event after an argument with Pomponius, who also respects Flamma's strength. At first, Flamma believed the rumors that the player was the one who instigated the recent gladiator revolts and only had second thoughts when the player spared his life after the battle.

Other characters
General Cassius: A famous general serving in Syria against the Parthians and other enemies of Rome. He opposes Marcus Aurelius for the choice of selecting an heir through birth rather than merit. Cassius has set in motion several plots to undermine Commodus' power in Rome, including funding Clodius' attempts to seize the Drusus family fortune and paying the lanista Generidus to start gladiator riots in an attempt to murder senators loyal to Commodus. Cassius eventually sends his armies to Rome in an attempt to seize the city while Commodus is absent, but he does not realize that this was a plot by Commodus to enable the player to kill the general while he is unprotected by his armies. After he is defeated by the player, Cassius laments over the fate of the Roman Empire, believing that Commodus would bring ruin to it.

Gulielmus: A Macedonian ex-criminal and gladiator who always crosses paths with the gladiator in the "Word Of Quintus", a gladiatorial event sponsored by the co-emperor, Lucius Verus. Gulielmus views the player with disdain and animosity and tends to underestimate the player's skill as a gladiator. When Gulielmus wins his freedom from the arena, he becomes a military officer under the command of General Cassius. When the player is sent by Commodus to kill Cassius, Gulielmus serves as the last enemy before the general is fought. When defeated by the player, Gulielmus is killed by Cassius' guards as punishment for his failure.

Bernados: A captain of the Praetorian Guard. A proud, devoted soldier, he never questions his faith towards Commodus and he makes sure that he is safe from assassins and anyone else who threaten his rule. However, when he chooses the player to aid him in protecting the Emperor's life, he is soon alienated by Commodus through a chain of events. Feeling that his position is being threatened, Bernados challenges the player to a duel in an attempt to regain Commodus' favor and is killed.

Dominicus: A Roman patrician and one among many who snub Brosius. A crude and vulgar man, Dominicus tried to purchase Medeia from Brosius. When he refused, Dominicus is deeply offended and bribes Brosius' allies to shun the lanista, bringing hardship to his ludus. He gradually regains his social standing with the player's help, so Dominicus attempts to end Brosius' recovery by proposing a bet. A duel is set up between the player and Dominicus' own gladiator, Castor. If Castor won, Dominicus would receive Brosius' lands and Medeia as a slave. If the player won, Brosius would gain Dominicus' lands. When the player defeats Castor, Dominicus realizes that he is now financially ruined and immediately commits suicide by jumping into a cage of beasts. After Dominicus' death, Brosius gains some favor in the eyes of other patricians.

Castor: A gladiator under the patronage of Dominicus and a former student of Brosius. Castor believes that slaves and gladiators should be grateful for whatever the patricians give to them and that freedom is ultimately a foolish idea. When Dominicus makes a bet with Brosius, a duel is set up between Castor and the player. When Castor is defeated, he ironically laments about dying as a lowly slave. In his final moments, he realizes how his life could have been different if he had chosen to pursue his desires.

Milichus: A gladiator and one of Elisaveta's many ex-lovers. While deeply charmed by Elisaveta, Milichus is also determined to break her to his will by any means necessary. An intelligent and cunning man, Milichus once attempted to have the player and Vipsanius killed by sending them into an ambush using letters written in each other's name. In retaliation for this, Vipsanius sets up a duel between the player and Milichus, intending to kill the victor himself in a later duel. Milichus is defeated, resulting in the player confronting Vipsanius.

Vipsanius: The treasurer of the Roman Senate and the husband of Elisaveta, Vipsanius once served in the Roman–Parthian Wars as a soldier in the Roman legions. He is the sponsor of the "Whisper of Egeria" events, although his wife does most of the event management. Elisaveta once described Vipsanius as cruel, sadistic and dominating, with the ability to inflict pain upon others while withholding death. After being tricked into ambush by Milichus, Vipsanius was determined to kill both Milichus and the player and punish his wife personally for her indiscretions. He is defeated by the player in a duel and he laments the fact that he has lost everything in his final moments.

Apicius: A Roman senator and a rival of Pomponius. Despite being a supporter of Commodus like his rival, Apicius competes fiercely with Pomponius in the gladiatorial games. Fights between gladiators supported by the opposing senators were quite common. Apicius is also the patron of the gladiator Flamma, who once fought the player due to an argument between the senators. Apicius later becomes a target of Generidus' riots and is narrowly saved by the player from a group of gladiators about to murder him. After Generidus is exposed and killed, Apicius vows to focus more on his duties as a senator in preparation for Commodus' reign as Emperor.

Generidus: A former gladiator, now the lanista of the Ludus Generidus, who has the patronage of the senators Pomponius and Apicius. As the feud between Commodus and General Cassius worsens, Generidus was paid by Cassius to dispose of Senators supporting Commodus. While he accepted the payment, Generidus also had a personal reason to follow Cassius' plan. He wanted retribution for the countless slaves sent to die in the arenas for the entertainment of the Roman Empire. To this end, he secretly starts several gladiator revolts to murder senators loyal to Commodus. When Aibell exposes Generidus as the instigator of the riots, the player chases the lanista into the depths of the Colosseum and kills him.

Publius: A slave of the Drusus family and an attendant of Aquila Drusus. Despite being a slave, Publius is very loyal to the Drusus family. He delivers and receives messages on Aquila's behalf and sometimes gives sound advice to the headstrong Aquila. When the Drusus family faces ostracization due to the mechanations of Clodius, Publius gives Aquila his emotional support.

Clodius: A centurion under the command of General Drusus during the campaign in Syria. Clodius has a low opinion of slaves and gladiators, the latter of whom he considers to be merely performers rather than true warriors. He is greatly disliked by Aquila, who considers him boorish. Cassius managed to gain Clodius' allegiance by promising him a high position within the Roman Empire. When General Drusus disappeared during an ambush by Persian raiders, Clodius hurried to Rome to report the general's death to the Drusus family despite having escaped before the death could be confirmed. His main objective was to claim the riches of the Drusus family by marrying Aquila, claiming that it was her father's last wish. When she refuses, Clodius causes trouble for the Drusus family by bribing ludi away from the "Smile of Bellona" events and even asks Sextus for help in a revenge scheme. Aquila eventually sets up a duel between the player and Clodius, who is defeated in battle.

Gameplay
Gladiator Begins is an action game which incorporates various RPG elements. Players can increase their gladiator's vitality, strength, and endurance with AP points earned by winning battles at the arena. The player first starts off by creating a custom gladiator, choosing either male or female, body size, skin color, and facial details. The player's gladiator will then begin his story working under his owner to pay off his slave debts by entering on multiple arenas.

In the arena, the player can prepare their gladiator with the proper equipments and move sets and choose from the available matches to enter. During the match, the player will attack with armed weapons or with their bare hands at other gladiator opponents. Gladiators can knock off other gladiator's weapons and armors and pick them up to use it in their favor. During different arenas and matches, there will be some replicated themes such as the battle aboard a ship and animals like tigers and elephants to fight against. After winning a match, the player will earn money and AP and return to hub area to prepare for the next day or move on with the story.

The combat control consists of using the PSP analog stick for movement and the Square and Circle Buttons to attack left and right respectively, the Triangle Button for head attack and X Button for low attack. The D-pad functions as equipping and removing weapons and armors that are dropped on the floor. Special skills can be set to the desired buttons as well.

Development
The game's predecessor, Colosseum: Road to Freedom, was originally published by Ertain on February 17, 2005 in Japan. Subsequently, game developer and publisher Acquire has acquired the rights to the Gladiator series from Ertain on October 1, 2008. Gladiator Begins was originally slated to be released on November 12, 2009 in Japan, but was pushed back to January 14, 2010 due to the discovery of a critical bug. The delay has also resulted in the implementation of an install feature, which allows the game to run more efficiently.

Gladiator Begins first gained notoriety during Tokyo Game Show 2009, for its scantily clad promotional model dressed as a female gladiator. Since then, the female gladiator has been featured on a promotional alternative cover in Japan, and as an in-game downloadable content.

Reception

The game received "mixed" reviews according to video game review aggregator Metacritic. In Japan, Famitsu gave it a score of two eights, one seven, and one eight, for a total of 31 out of 40.

References

External links
 
 Gladiator Begins official website for Japan 
 Gladiator Begins official website for North America

Role-playing video games
Action role-playing video games
PlayStation Portable games
PlayStation Portable-only games
Video games set in the Roman Empire
Video game sequels
2010 video games
Video games about gladiatorial combat
Video games developed in Japan
Video games featuring protagonists of selectable gender